Gagea is a large genus of spring flowers in the lily family. It is found primarily in Eurasia with a few species extending into North Africa and one species (Gagea serotina) in North America.

The genus is named after the English naturalist Sir Thomas Gage (1791-1820). They were originally described as species of Ornithogalum, which, together with the usual yellow colour of the flowers, explains the English name yellow star-of-Bethlehem for the common European species, Gagea lutea.

Species
, the World Checklist of Selected Plant Families recognizes over 200 species, including those previously assigned to Lloydia.

References

Bibliography

External links

Pacific Bulb Society photos of several species
Treknature, Photos of Gagea sp., a genus of the family Liliaceae  photos of several species

 
Liliaceae genera